The Old Marion County Courthouse is a historic county courthouse building in Tazewell, Georgia, which served as the county seat of Marion County, Georgia for a short time. It was built in 1848. The county seat was moved in 1850 to what is now Buena Vista, Georgia. The site is commemorated with a historical marker. The building has also served as Marion Lodge No. 14 F. & A.M. (Free and Accepted Masons).

The building was added to the National Register of Historic Places in 1980 and is located on Georgia State Route 137.

See also
National Register of Historic Places listings in Marion County, Georgia
 Old Chattahoochee County Courthouse - similar courthouse

References

External links
Photo of courthouse on Flickr

Courthouses on the National Register of Historic Places in Georgia (U.S. state)
Marion County Courthouse
Buildings and structures in Marion County, Georgia
National Register of Historic Places in Marion County, Georgia